Kurt Knispel (20 September 1921 – 28 April 1945) was a German tank commander during World War II. Knispel was profiled extensively in the second installment of the popular historical fiction series Panzer Aces, which included an unfounded claim of having 168 tank kills. 

Knispel was severely wounded on 28 April 1945 by shrapnel to his head when his Tiger II was hit in battle by Soviet tanks. He died two hours later in a German field hospital.

On 10 April 2013, Czech authorities said that Knispel's remains were found with 15 other German soldiers behind a church wall in Vrbovec, identified by his dog tags.

On 12 November 2014, the German War Graves Commission reburied his remains at the Central Brno military cemetery in Brno. He was buried with 41 other German soldiers who died in Moravia and Silesia.

Awards
 German Cross in Gold on 20 May 1944 as Unteroffizier in the 1./schwere Panzer-Abteilung 503

References

1921 births
1945 deaths
People from Zlaté Hory
Sudeten German people
Naturalized citizens of Germany
Panzer commanders
Recipients of the Gold German Cross
German Army personnel killed in World War II
German Army soldiers of World War II